The men's 25 km competition of the open water swimming events at the 2013 World Aquatics Championships was held on July 27.

Results
The race was started at 08:00.

References

Open water swimming at the 2013 World Aquatics Championships
World Aquatics Championships